Rajaküla may refer to several places in Estonia:

Rajaküla, Ida-Viru County, village in Mäetaguse Parish, Ida-Viru County
Rajaküla, Lääne-Viru County, village in Laekvere Parish, Lääne-Viru County